Tapjeong-dong was an administrative dong or a neighbourhood in the administrative subdivisions of the Gyeongju City, North Gyeongsang province, South Korea until January 2009. It consisted of four legal dong including Tap-dong, Sajeong-dong, Yul-dong, and Bae-dong.

It was bordered by Jungang-dong and Hwangnam-dong on the east, Seondo-dong and Geoncheon-eup on the west, Naenam-myeon on the south and Seonggeon-dong on the north. Its 19.68 square kilometers were home to about 5,630 people. The Poseokjeong and Hongnyunsa temple sites were situated in the district.

See also
Subdivisions of Gyeongju
Administrative divisions of South Korea

References

External links
 The official site of Gyeongju city

Subdivisions of Gyeongju